Amjed Bedewi (born 1954 in Arar, Saudi Arabia) is a Saudi diplomat and incumbent Saudi Arabia Ambassador to Guinea, Sierra Leone. He was nominated by King Abdullah bin Abdulaziz Al Saud. He was sworn in on July 18, 2009.

Biography
Amjed Bedewi graduated from King Abdulaziz University in 1977 with a B.A, the Gateway High School of New Heaven in 1980 with a MBA. He joined the Saudi Diplomatic Service in 1980. Bedewi is married and has two daughters and two sons.

Career
In 1980, Bedewi  joined the Saudi Diplomatic Service, he served as the Saudi Ambassador to the Republic of Cameroon from 2002 to 2009 also as Saudi charges d'affaires to Indonesia from 1994 to 1999 and in Paris from 1981 to 1987. His foreign languages include English, French, Indonesian.

External links
 Royal Embassy of Saudi Arabia - Conakry

1954 births
Living people
Saudi Arabian diplomats
People from Arar, Saudi Arabia
Ambassadors of Saudi Arabia to Cameroon
Ambassadors of Saudi Arabia to the Central African Republic
Ambassadors of Saudi Arabia to Equatorial Guinea
Ambassadors of Saudi Arabia to Guinea
Ambassadors of Saudi Arabia to Sierra Leone